Vasilyevka is a rural locality (a settlement) in Mikhaylovsky Selsoviet, Ust-Kalmansky District, Altai Krai, Russia. The population was 79 as of 2013. There is 1 street.

Geography 
Vasilyevka is located 58 km southeast of Ust-Kalmanka (the district's administrative centre) by road. Mikhaylovka is the nearest rural locality.

References 

Rural localities in Ust-Kalmansky District